Golden Age Collectables is a comic book store at Seattle's Pike Place Market, in the U.S. state of Washington.

Description 

Curbed Seattle has described Golden Age Collectables as "Seattle's longest-running comic book shop" and "a popular tourist-photo spot because of a convenient Pike Place Market location and a selfie-ready Batman statue outside". Thrillist has called the shop as "a hodgepodge of nerdy/kitschy knick knacks, comic books and bric-a-brac". The business has also been described as "the largest comic book and movie nostalgia store in the Northwest", as well as the oldest comic book shop in the United States.

The Seattle Times has said the shop is "a full-fledged pop culture emporium". According to Seattle Metropolitan, "Here, each aisle gives way to another just as stocked with age-defying treasures, from a full wall of Funko Pop figures to what feels like an entire franchise worth of Star Wars paraphernalia, to, obviously, rows and rows of comics." Lonely Planet has said, "A haven for geeks, kids and, especially, geeky kids, this shop has comics and comic-book-inspired toys, novelty items (hopping nuns etc) costumes and loads of goth-friendly knickknacks".

The shop has also stocked autographs and film scripts, as well as Japanese and vintage toys. Golden Age hosts special events such as visits by superheroes.

History 
Established in 1961, Golden Age Collectables is billed as the oldest comic book shop in the world. Ron Dyke has owned the business since 1971. The Seattle Times described him as a co-owner in 2008. His wife Colleen Dyke also helps run the business.

Reception 
In Seattle Family Adventures: City Escapades, Day Trips, Weekend Getaways, and Itineraries for Fun-Loving Families (2017), Kate Calamusa said a visit to the shop "is sure to bring out everyone's inner kid with its extensive collection of comics, toys, and games". In his 2020 book Moon Pacific Coast Highway Road Trip: California, Oregon & Washington, Ian Anderson called Golden Age "a throwback where just about everything is nostalgic", with "kitschy items from lunch boxes to bobbleheads". He recommended, "Step inside to summon your inner nerd.

See also
 List of reportedly haunted locations in the United States

References

External links 

 
 Golden Age Collectables at Pike Place Market

1961 establishments in Washington (state)
American companies established in 1961
Central Waterfront, Seattle
Comic book collecting
Pike Place Market